Birchall is an English surname deriving from the settlement of Biekel, Lancashire, and derived from Birch - hill. The village of Biekel later became "Birtle".

Variant forms include Burchall and Burchill.

It is most commonly found in the North-West of England, particularly Lancashire. The highest proportion of bearers can be found in Wigan, Greater Manchester. The first recorded bearer was John de Birchall de Birtles in 1401.

The surname is less commonly found in other areas of the former British Empire, including Canada and the United States.  Only one early migrant to Australia was recorded with this name, a convicted criminal, James Stanley Birchall, a Protestant from Chorley in Lancashire; on 10 April 1851 he was sent to  Norfolk Island for committing forgery.

The surname is also found in Sussex where it appears to have originated from the village of Billingshurst, where it can be found in the sixteenth century in its original form of Burchfold; this changed to Burchall in the mid-seventeenth century. A branch of the family migrated to Guildford, Surrey where they supplied two mayors – John and Richard Burchall, who entered a pedigree in the Heralds Visitations.

Notable people with the name
Surname
Adam Birchall (born 1984), Welsh football forward
Ben Birchall, Australian musician
Ben Birchall (born 1977), World Champion motorcycle sidecar racing driver 
Cathy Birchall (–2013), British long-distance motorcyclist
Chris Birchall (born 1984), English–Trinidadian football midfielder
Chris Birchall (rugby league) (born 1981), Scottish rugby league and rugby union player
Ed Birchall (1923–1988), American clown
Edward Vivian Birchall (1884–1916), English philanthropist
Ellis Birchall (fl. 1945), English football back
Grant Birchall (born 1988), Australian rules footballer
Ian Birchall (born 1939), British Marxist historian and translator
Jack Birchall (born 1876), English footballer
James Derek Birchall (1930–1995), English chemist and inventor
John Birchall (1875–1941), British soldier and Conservative Party politician
Joseph Birchall (fl. 1902–1903), English football winger
Jud Birchall (1855–1887), American baseball left fielder
Leonard Birchall (1915–2004), Canadian air force officer
Paul Birchall (aka Burchill) (born 1979), English wrestler
Reginald Birchall (1866–1890), British conman
Richard Birchall (born 1887), English professional footballer
Robert Birchall (–1819), English music seller, publisher, and instrument dealer
Shannon Birchall, Australian bassist
Tom Birchall (born 1986), World Champion motorcycle sidecar racing passenger

Given name
Birchall Pearson (1914–1960), Canadian athlete

Fictional character
Suzie Birchall in Coronation Street

See also
Burchill

References